Kaya ng Powers is a 2010 Philippine television fantasy situational comedy series broadcast by GMA Network. Directed by Uro dela Cruz, it stars Rhian Ramos, Sheena Halili, Elmo Magalona, Joey Marquez and Rufa Mae Quinto. It premiered on July 24, 2010. The series concluded on November 13, 2010 with a total of 17 episodes.

Cast and characters

Lead cast
Rhian Ramos as Hillary Jackson Powers
Sheena Halili as Shalani Jackson Powers
Elmo Magalona as Gustin Jackson Powers
Jillian Ward as Janna Jackson Powers
Joey Marquez as Robert Esteban Powers
Rufa Mae Quinto as Margaret Jackson Powers

Supporting cast
Jaya Ramsey as Helen Heneres
Dang Cruz as Yaya Alfreda
Rocco Nacino as Clinton Llib
Enzo Pineda as Noy Aquino
Diego Llorico as Bebe Girl
 Elijah Alejo as Amferia Amfon "Amfi" Heneres
Alyssa Alano as Eva Eugenia
Bearwin Meily as Donald 

Guest cast
Daniel Matsunaga as Lineman
John Lapus as Tuod Gay
Sam Pinto as Samantha
Fabio Ide as Max
Katrina Halili as Carlotta
Sarah Lahbati as Clarisse
Rox Montealegre as Monique
Dang Cruz as Yaya Alfreda/Palaka Queen
Barbie Forteza as Bambi
Steven Silva as Carlo
Tado Jimenez as Raco
Luis Alandy as Rico
German Moreno as Kuya Germs
Jenny Miller as Maureen
Julian Trono as Mac
Aljur Abrenica

Ratings
According to AGB Nielsen Philippines' Mega Manila People/Individual television ratings, the final episode of Kaya ng Powers scored a 7.5% rating.

References

External links
 

2010 Philippine television series debuts
2010 Philippine television series endings
Filipino-language television shows
GMA Network original programming
Philippine comedy television series
Philippine television sitcoms
Television shows set in the Philippines